Carnegie Hall Concert refers to several recordings made at New York City's Carnegie Hall:

Carnegie Hall Concert (Buck Owens album), 1966
Carnegie Hall Concert (Dizzy Gillespie album), 1961
Carnegie Hall Concert (Gerry Mulligan and Chet Baker album), 1975
Carnegie Hall Concert (Toshiko Akiyoshi Jazz Orchestra album), 1992
The Carnegie Hall Concert (Keith Jarrett album), 2006
The Carnegie Hall Concert: June 18, 1971, an album by Carole King, 1996
The Carnegie Hall Concerts (disambiguation), a 1940s series of live albums by Duke Ellington

See also
The Famous 1938 Carnegie Hall Jazz Concert, an album by Benny Goodman, 1950
The Carnegie Hall Performance, a comedy album by Lewis Black, 2006
Live at Carnegie Hall (disambiguation)
At Carnegie Hall (disambiguation)